

The Dornier N was a bomber aircraft designed in Germany in the 1920s for production in Japan. Production of 28 aircraft started in Japan in 1927, as the Kawasaki Ka 87 (also known as the Type 87 Night Bomber). Designed and built as a landplane, its layout was strongly reminiscent of the Dornier flying boats of the same period; a parasol-wing, strut-braced monoplane with two engines, mounted in a push-pull nacelle above the wing. Some of the 28 examples built saw action in Manchuria in 1931.

Specifications

References

Bibliography

External links

 German aircraft between 1919-1945
 Уголок неба

Do N
1920s Japanese bomber aircraft
Ka 87
Twin-engined push-pull aircraft
Parasol-wing aircraft
Aircraft first flown in 1926